A Man Like Maximilian is a 1945 German comedy film directed by Hans Deppe and starring Wolf Albach-Retty, Karin Hardt and Lizzi Waldmüller. It was one of the last films released during the Third Reich and was playing in cinemas during the Battle of Berlin.

The film's sets were designed by the art directors Franz Bi and Bruno Lutz.

Synopsis
When her daughter becomes engaged to a respectable lawyer, her mother is delighted as she sees the fiancée as being like her own husband Maximilian. However, suspicions begin to arise that he may be concealing a secret from them.

Cast
 Wolf Albach-Retty as Doctor Thomas Hesse
 Karin Hardt as Monika, dessen Frau
 Lizzi Waldmüller as Alexandra Durran, Sängerin
 Fritz Odemar as Maximilian Holten
 Hermine Ziegler as Fränze Holten
 Norbert Rohringer as Fips Holten
 Max Gülstorff as Heinrich Holten
 Paul Dahlke as Theaterdirektor Rother
 Hannes Keppler as Carol Witt, Tenor
 Auguste Pünkösdy as Frau Durran
 Victor Janson as Theaterdirektor
 Angelo Ferrari as Regisseur
 Emmy Flemmich as Frau Meier
 Rosemarie Grosser as Frl. Behr, Sekretärin
 Emil Reissner as Bühnenportier
 Emilie Bösl as Josefa, Magd
 Karl Neumayer as Briefträger
 Ina Albrecht as Loni, Hausmädchen

References

Bibliography 
 Bock, Hans-Michael & Bergfelder, Tim. The Concise CineGraph. Encyclopedia of German Cinema. Berghahn Books, 2009.

External links 
 

1945 films
1945 comedy films
German comedy films
Films of Nazi Germany
1940s German-language films
Films directed by Hans Deppe
Bavaria Film films
German black-and-white films
1940s German films